Nocona is a city along U.S. Highway 82 and State Highway 175 in Montague County, Texas, United States. The population was 3,033 at the 2010 census.  The city, its lake, and its resurgence as a regional travel destination were featured in the June 2012 edition of Texas Highways magazine.

History
The city is named for Peta Nocona, the Comanche chief.  The area was first known to white settlers as the last stop in Texas before crossing the Red River on the Chisolm Trail.  It was founded in 1887 along a particular bend in the Gainesville, Henrietta and Western Railway line, which soon became part of the Missouri-Kansas-Texas Railroad, connecting Gainesville and Henrietta, and later Wichita Falls.  Nocona assumed the role of economic and industrial center of northern Montague County, and many older towns in the area, bypassed by the railroad, and its businesses shuttered. Its citizens moved to Nocona. The city has steadily maintained a population around 3000 since the 1940s, though industries responsible for its growth have come and gone.  The "North Field", an oil field between Nocona and the Red River, contributed to Nocona's economy for much of the 20th century and continues to do so on a small scale.  The MKT line, which was responsible for Nocona's founding, was abandoned in 1969 and the tracks removed in 1971.  Nocona also has a proud history of leather works and has been home to Justin Industries, Nocona Boot Company, and the Nocona Belt Company.  Nocona Boot Company and Justin Industries have since moved; however, the Montague Boot Company has been established in downtown Nocona, making boots for the Larry Mahan line at Cavender's Boot City.  Also integral to the Nocona economy is the Nocona Athletic Goods Company (product names are spelled "Nokona"), which manufactures baseball gloves, bats, catcher's equipment, and other sports accessories.  The Athletic Goods' facilities burned in July 2006, and production has been moved to a temporary facility.  Significant efforts are currently underway to revitalize the Clay Street downtown area. See an example of refurbishing a downtown landmark from start to finish at the F&M Bank Face Lift Project.

Nocona has a lake, about 10 miles north of the city, appropriately named Lake Nocona, or Farmer's Creek Reservoir.  It is a recreational lake popular with people from across north-central Texas. On Lake Nocona sits Nocona Hills, an attractive gated lakeside "city" with many homes, a hotel, golf course, landing strip, and other amenities.  Nocona is also home to an 18-hole golf course, airstrip (FAA identifier F48), hospital, and one of the finest city parks in Texas.

Geography

Demographics

2020 census

As of the 2020 United States census, there were 3,002 people, 1,100 households, and 785 families residing in the city.

2000 census
As of the census of 2000,  3,198 people, 1,286 households, and 825 families resided in the city.  The population density was 1,134.5 people per square mile (437.9/km).  The 1,456 housing units averaged 516.5/sq mi (199.3/km).  The racial makeup of the city was 93.59% White, 0.25% African American, 0.84% Native American, 0.34% Asian, 0.03% Pacific Islander, 3.31% from other races, and 1.63% from two or more races. Hispanics or Latinos of any race were 12.48% of the population.

Of the 1,286 households, 31.5% had children under the age of 18 living with them, 48.1% were married couples living together, 12.1% had a female householder with no husband present, and 35.8% were no t families. About 33.5% of all households were made up of individuals, and 19.8% had someone living alone who was 65 years of age or older.  The average household size was 2.39 and the average family size was 3.04.

In the city, the population was distributed as  26.6% under the age of 18, 7.2% from 18 to 24, 25.3% from 25 to 44, 19.2% from 45 to 64, and 21.7% who were 65 years of age or older.  The median age was 38 years. For every 100 females, there were 83.6 males.  For every 100 females age 18 and over, there were 80.8 males.

The median income for a household in the city was $28,893, and for a family was $35,000. Males had a median income of $24,868 versus $16,500 for females. The per capita income for the city was $14,080.  About 10.6% of families and 16.9% of the population were below the poverty line, including 23.3% of those under age 18 and 15.9% of those age 65 or over.

Education
The City of Nocona is served by the Nocona Independent School District.
Nocona High School's mascot is the Indians and the Braves.

Notable people

 Joseph Sterling Bridwell, the Wichita Falls rancher, oilman, and philanthropist, drilled his first oil well near Nocona in 1921
 Jack Crain, a.k.a. "Jackrabbit" was the  1939, 1941 All Southwest Conference and two-time All-American halfback, Texas legend, and the man who saved Texas Longhorns football team in 1939. Mr. Crain also served four terms as a Texas state representative for district 61
 Joe Hancock, American Quarter Horse legend. Joe Hancock foaled c. 1925, was raised by John Jackson Hancock, and was trained by Elbert Bird Ogle in Claypool, OK. After his racing career, he lived out his days at the 6666/Triangle ranch until he died in 1943.  He was inducted into the American Quarter Horse Association's Hall of Fame in 1992
 Herman Joseph Justin, Founder of the Justin Industries.  H. J. Justin was born in Indiana in 1859 and moved to Gainesville, Texas, in 1877.  He opened his boot business at Spanish Fort along the Chisholm Trail in 1879 with a $35 loan from the local barber.  His boots became known for quality craftsmanship and durability among cowboys. In 1887, he moved the business to Nocona to be near the new railroad.  He died in 1918
 Enid Justin, Founder of the Nocona Boot Company and daughter of H.J. "Daddy Joe" Justin, founder of Justin Boots.  Ms. Justin was a longtime supporter of youth programs in Nocona such as the boys' and girls' Little League and the city park
 Ruth Roach (1896–1986), championship bronc rider and rodeo performer, retired to a ranch near Nocona
 Charles C. "Charlie" Robertson, 1915 Nocona High School graduate, Mr. Robertson went on to play major league baseball with the Chicago White Sox, St. Louis Browns, and Boston Braves. While with the White Sox, Robertson pitched a perfect game, recorded on April 30, 1922

Transportation

 U.S. Highway 82    East–West:  Georgia to New Mexico
 FM 103    North–South:  Nocona to Spanish Fort
 FM 1759   East–West: Nocona to northwestern Montague County
 FM 1956   East–West: Nocona to Capps Corner

Climate
The climate in this area is characterized by hot, humid summers and generally mild to cool winters.  According to the Köppen climate classification system, Nocona has a humid subtropical climate, Cfa on climate maps.

References

External links
Horton Classic Car Museum
Nocona Chamber of Commerce
Nocona Economic Development Corporation
Nocona Independent School District
Fishing Lake Nocona
History of the Chisholm Trail
Lost Places of Nocona
Nocona: A View of the 50s
NHS Distinguished Alumni
F&M Bank Face Lift Project

Nocona Cemetery

 Hope 29:11, Inc. Foodbank Outreach

Cities in Texas
Cities in Montague County, Texas